SS Australien  was a French passenger ship that was sunk during World War I on 19 July 1918 in the Mediterranean Sea  northeast of Cap Bon, Tunisia, by a torpedo fired by the Imperial German Navy submarine SM UC-54. Three of her 951 passengers and seventeen of her crew died in the sinking.

See also
SS Polynesien (1890)

References 

1889 ships
Maritime incidents in 1918
Ships built in France
Ships sunk by German submarines in World War I
World War I shipwrecks in the Mediterranean Sea